, anglicized Miosgan Meva and also called Maeve's Cairn, is a large cairn on the summit of Knocknarea in County Sligo, Ireland. It is thought to conceal a passage tomb from the Neolithic (New Stone Age). It is the largest cairn in Ireland, excepting those at Brú na Bóinne in Meath.

The cairn is flat-topped and several kerbstones can be seen on the northern side. It is believed to date to around 3000 BCE. Archaeologist Stefan Bergh, in his book Landscape of the Monuments (1995), suggests that a large hollow some way to the west of the cairn was the quarry from which the stones were taken. 

The cairn is a protected National Monument. In recent years, archaeologists have warned that the cairn is being eroded by hikers climbing on it and moving or removing stones. The large number of climbers is leaving scars on the cairn and may be destabilizing the tomb inside. Irish folklore holds that it is bad luck to damage or disrespect such tombs and that doing so could bring a curse.

Miosgán Meadhbha is Irish for "Meadhbh's heap". Meadhbh is a queen of Connacht in Irish mythology, who is believed to have originally been a sovereignty goddess.

References

Archaeological sites in County Sligo
National Monuments in County Sligo
Megalithic monuments in Ireland
Tombs in the Republic of Ireland
Neolithic sites of Europe
Women and death